New Richmond High School (NRHS) is a public high school located in New Richmond, Wisconsin, serving grades 9 through 12. The Tigers welcomed Nichole Benson as new NRHS Principal for the 2022-23  school year. The mission of NRHS is "Inspire Every Student to Learn to His or Her Potential". New Richmond High School is a part of the New Richmond School District

References

External links
 School District of New Richmond
 City of New Richmond

Public high schools in Wisconsin
Schools in St. Croix County, Wisconsin